Beaver Brook Falls Wayside is a  park in Colebrook, New Hampshire, along Route 145. It features a roadside view of the scenic   Beaver Brook Falls. Picnic tables, restroom facilities and a small picnic shelter are available.

The park is 1 of 10 New Hampshire state parks that are in the path of totality for the 2024 solar eclipse, with the park experiencing 3 minutes and 3 seconds of totality.

Photos

References

External links

Beaver Brook Falls Wayside New Hampshire Department of Natural and Cultural Resources 

State parks of New Hampshire
Parks in Coös County, New Hampshire
Colebrook, New Hampshire
Waterfalls of New Hampshire